Lecithocera macrotoma is a moth in the family Lecithoceridae. It was described by Edward Meyrick in 1918. It is found in China.

References

Moths described in 1918
macrotoma